The Turning is an album by Leslie Phillips that was released by Myrrh in 1987 and re-released in 1997 under the name Sam Phillips.

This album marks the first time Phillips worked with producer T Bone Burnett. The two married soon after the release of this album, and Burnett would go on to produce more albums for the singer. The Turning stands out as a turning point in Phillips' career as a singer and songwriter; on one side, the cheerful, upbeat pop-rock albums that she recorded in the early 1980s, and, on the other, the quirky 60's music influenced rock and folk albums, with a much darker and more poetic tone lyrically.

This album was listed at No. 8 in the book CCM Presents: The 100 Greatest Albums in Christian Music.The Turning peaked at number 21 on the Billboard Top Inspirational Albums chart.

Track listing

Personnel 
 Leslie Phillips – vocals, harmony vocals, synthesizers, drum programming
 John Andrew Schreiner – synthesizers
 T Bone Burnett – guitars, drum programming, harmony vocals
 Jerry Scheff – bass (1, 3-10)
 David Miner – bass (2)
 Mickey Curry – drums
 Ralph Forbes – drum programming
 Alex Acuña – percussion
 Peter Case – harmony vocals 
 Tonio K – harmony vocals 
 Dawn O'Hanlon – harmony vocals

Production 
 T Bone Burnett – producer
 Tom Willet – executive producer
 Tchad Blake – recording, mixing
 Steven Ford – recording
 Larry Hirsch – recording
 Bill Jackson – recording
 Stephen Shelton – recording
 Mike Kloster – recording assistant 
 David Knights – recording assistant
 Brian Gardner – original mastering at Bernie Grundman Mastering (Hollywood, California)
 Steve Hoffman – remastering (1998 release)
 Michael Hodgson – art direction, design
 Dennis Keeley – photography
 Pete Caravolais – photography assistant 
 Tony Proctor Lambe – hair stylist, make-up artist

Charts

Radio singles

References

1987 albums
Sam Phillips (musician) albums
Albums produced by T Bone Burnett
Myrrh Records albums
Word Records albums